Silvio Fraquelli (born 25 June 1952) is an Italian former pole vaulter.

He won one medal at the International athletics competitions.

Biography
He competed in the 1972 Summer Olympics, he has 22 caps in national team from 1971 to 1976.

His twin brother, Osvaldo, was also an athlete.

Olympic results

National championships
He has won 6 times the individual national championship.
5 wins in the pole vault (1972, 1973, 1974, 1975, 1976)
1 win in the pole vault indoor (1972)

References

External links
 

1952 births
Living people
Italian male pole vaulters
Olympic athletes of Italy
Athletes (track and field) at the 1972 Summer Olympics
Mediterranean Games gold medalists for Italy
Athletes (track and field) at the 1975 Mediterranean Games
Mediterranean Games medalists in athletics